is a Japanese speed skater and track cyclist.

Maki Tabata won bronze at the World Allround Championships in 2000 and one month later, she won another bronze, this time on the 3000 m at the World Single Distance Championships. The next year (2001), she won silver on the 1500 m and bronze on the 5000 m at the World Single Distance Championships. In 2003, she won another World Single Distance silver on the 1500 m.

In addition, Tabata has won numerous titles and medals at the Asian Championships that are used to qualify for the World Allround Championships, at the Asian Single Distance Championships, and at Japanese Championships (both in Allround and Single Distance). She also has a few World Cup victories, both in individual events and in the team pursuit.

As a track cyclist she competed in four events at the 2012 UCI Track Cycling World Championships and won medals in four disciplines at the 2012 Asian Cycling Championships, including a gold medal in the individual pursuit.

World records 
Over the course of her career, Tabata skated one world record:

Personal records 
To put these personal records in perspective, the last column (WR) lists the official world records on the dates that Tabata skated her personal records.

References 

 
 Profile at CyclingArchives.com

External links 
 
 
 
 
 

1974 births
Japanese female speed skaters
Japanese female cyclists
Speed skaters at the 1994 Winter Olympics
Speed skaters at the 2002 Winter Olympics
Speed skaters at the 2006 Winter Olympics
Speed skaters at the 2010 Winter Olympics
Speed skaters at the 2014 Winter Olympics
Olympic speed skaters of Japan
Medalists at the 2010 Winter Olympics
Olympic medalists in speed skating
Olympic silver medalists for Japan
Speed skaters at the 2003 Asian Winter Games
Speed skaters at the 2007 Asian Winter Games
Speed skaters at the 2017 Asian Winter Games
Medalists at the 2003 Asian Winter Games
Medalists at the 2007 Asian Winter Games
Asian Games medalists in speed skating
Asian Games gold medalists for Japan
Asian Games bronze medalists for Japan
Sportspeople from Hokkaido
Living people
Japanese track cyclists
World Allround Speed Skating Championships medalists
World Single Distances Speed Skating Championships medalists